Arveson may refer to:

 Arveson Township, Minnesota
 William Arveson (1934–2011), American mathematician